Bailey Branch is a stream in Miller County, the U.S. state of Missouri. It is a tributary of Barren Fork.

Bailey Branch has the name of R. B. Bailey, a pioneer citizen.

See also
List of rivers of Missouri

References

Rivers of Miller County, Missouri
Rivers of Missouri